Vitali Hakko (1913 – 10 December 2007) was a Turkish businessman, founder of the Vakko clothing business.

He was laid to rest at the Ulus Sephardi Jewish Cemetery in Istanbul following the religious funeral ceremony held at the Neve Shalom Synagogue. He was survived by his son Cem Hakko.

References

1913 births
Turkish Jews
20th-century Turkish businesspeople
20th-century Sephardi Jews
21st-century Sephardi Jews
2007 deaths